Thornton Township High School District may refer to:
Thornton Township High Schools District 205
Thornton Fractional Township High School District 215